Christy K. Holland is an American scientist and professor of internal medicine and biomedical engineering at the University of Cincinnati. After a B.A. with majors in physics and music at Wellesley College, she obtained her Ph.D.in engineering and applied science from Yale University. Holland is editor-in-chief of Ultrasound in Medicine and Biology. Holland's articles in peer-reviewed scientific journals have been cited over 6300 times, giving her an h-index of 46.

Honors
Holland is a fellow of the Acoustical Society of America, the American Institute of Ultrasound in Medicine, and the American Institute for Medical and Biological Engineering.

References

External links

Year of birth missing (living people)
Living people
Medical physicists
Academic journal editors
University of Cincinnati faculty
Yale University alumni
Women biophysicists
Women medical researchers